Bhairavnath may refer to:

Bhairava, a fierce manifestation of Lord Shiva
Bhairav (tantrik), a tantrik known as Bhairavnath, associated with shrine of Vaishno Devi